Hampstead may refer to:

Places

In the United Kingdom

 Hampstead, an area of London
 Hampstead (UK Parliament constituency) 
 Hampstead and Kilburn (UK Parliament constituency)
 Hampstead and Highgate (UK Parliament constituency)
 Hampstead School
 Hampstead Town (ward), electoral area
 Hampstead Heath, a park
 Hampstead tube station
 Hampstead Heath railway station
 Hampstead Theatre
 Hampstead Garden Suburb, a suburb of London
 South Hampstead, an area in northwest London
 South Hampstead High School
 South Hampstead railway station
 South Hampstead (ward), electoral area
 West Hampstead, an area in northwest London
 West Hampstead railway station
 West Hampstead Thameslink railway station
 West Hampstead tube station

In Canada
 Hampstead, Quebec
 Hampstead, New Brunswick
 Hampstead Parish, New Brunswick

In Dominica
 Hampstead, Dominica

In New Zealand
Hampstead, New Zealand, a suburb in the town of Ashburton in the Canterbury Region

In the United States
Hampstead, Maryland, a town in Carroll County
Hampstead, New Hampshire, a town in Rockingham County
Hampstead (Jerusalem, New York), an historic home 
Hampstead, North Carolina, an unincorporated community in Pender County
Hampstead (Tunstall, Virginia), an historic plantation house in New Kent County
Ramapo, New York, formerly known as New Hempstead and then Hampstead

Other
 Hampstead (computer game), a satirical text adventure released by Melbourne House
 Hampstead (film), a 2017 British drama film

See also 
Hamstead (disambiguation)
Hempstead (disambiguation)
Homestead (disambiguation)